is a district located in Fukushima Prefecture, Japan.

As of 2008, the district has an estimated population of 31,175 and a density of 31.6 persons per km2. The total area is 986.763 km2.

Towns and villages
Bandai
Inawashiro
Nishiaizu
Kitashiobara

Merger
 On January 4, 2006, the towns of Shiokawa and Yamato, and the villages of Atsushiokanō and Takasato merged into the city of Kitakata.

Districts in Fukushima Prefecture
District Yama